Micropleurotoma melvilli is a species of sea snail, a marine gastropod mollusk in the family Horaiclavidae.

Description
The length of the shell attains 6 mm, its diameter 2.6 mm.

(Original description) The spire of the small, elongate, shell is well raised, varying a good deal in the relative proportions of length and breadth. The colour is hyaline white. It contains 6 whorls, turreted, carinated, regularly but slowly increasing. The suture is well marked, with a small strap-like rim below it. The protoconch is large, white, smooth and elevated. The remaining whorls are marked by a strong spiral keel, which is either smooth or bears acute nodules lines of growth well marked. The aperture is fairly broad. The columella is twisted at the base.

Distribution
This species occurs in the demersal zone of the Atlantic Ocean off Portugal at depths between 1340 m and 2000 m.

References

 Gofas, S.; Le Renard, J.; Bouchet, P. (2001). Mollusca. in: Costello, M.J. et al. (eds), European Register of Marine Species: a check-list of the marine species in Europe and a bibliography of guides to their identification. Patrimoines Naturels. 50: 180–213

External links
 Rex, Michael A., et al. "A source-sink hypothesis for abyssal biodiversity." The American Naturalist 165.2 (2004): 163–178.
 Olabarria, Celia. "Faunal change and bathymetric diversity gradient in deep-sea prosobranchs from Northeastern Atlantic." Marine, Freshwater, and Wetlands Biodiversity Conservation. Springer Netherlands, 2006. 317–334.
 Bouchet, Philippe, and Marco Taviani. "The Mediterranean deep-sea fauna: pseudopopulations of Atlantic species?." Deep Sea Research Part A. Oceanographic Research Papers 39.2 (1992): 169–184.

melvilli
Gastropods described in 1906